is a compilation album by Japanese rock band Sakanaction. It was released on March 28, 2018, to commemorate the tenth anniversary of the band's major debut. Physical editions are accompanied by a fish-themed book about the music, in keeping with the band's name and frequent references to fish ( means fish in Japanese).

One new song , which was used as the theme song for the live-action adaptation of the fantasy manga Donten ni Warau, is also featured in the album. The album was considerably successful, topping both the Oricon and Billboard Japan Hot Albums charts.

The book, bearing English title Book of Fishes, contains artwork, information, and commentary about the songs on the release. Handwriting above the title of the book that comes with the 3-CD premium box indicates it is a "fish encyclopedia", whereas the editions with 2 CDs instead come with a condensed version designated as a "fish picture book".

Track listing

Charts and sales

Sales

Release history

References 

2018 compilation albums
Japanese-language compilation albums
Sakanaction albums
Victor Entertainment compilation albums